And Then Came Fall is a Belgian indie pop band with singer-songwriter roots based in Leuven, Belgium. Its members are Annelies Tanghe (vocals, guitar, keys, percussion) and Sam Pieter Janssens (guitar, bass, percussion, backing vocals, production). Annelies Tanghe and Sam Pieter Janssens have known each other from playing in bands before they started And Then Came Fall in 2017.

The band's first self-titled album, And Then Came Fall, was released on Starman Records on February 1, 2018. The album received critical acclaim.

On February 14, 2020, And Then Came Fall premiered a new single, Should We on their YouTube channel. This song would be the first single of a new upcoming album and the start of a live tour in March 2020 in support of Belgian rock band De Mens. However, the COVID-19 pandemic changed plans. Instead of releasing a new album Annelies Tanghe and Sam Pieter Janssens worked, both in their own homestudio, on a song called "Please Don't Disappear". Starman Records released the song on April 7, 2020. It featured on playlists on Spotify and got national airplay (Radio1, Studio Brussel).

History

And Then Came Fall (2018, full album) 
Annelies and Sam had been producing elaborated demos of their songs in the summer of 2016. The songs were re-recorded at La Patrie studio in Ghent, Belgium, during winter of 2016, together with producer Koen Gisen. Steven Van Gelder played drums and Jasper Hautekiet bass on the album tracks. The band's debut album eventually got printed on vinyl after raising funds via crowdfunding. And Then Came Fall signed up with Starman Records for promotion and distribution of the album. Rootstime.be about the record: "This could be the debut of the year!" Flemish daily newspaper De Standaard: "Strong melodies, lots of emotions about love and society and a beautiful mix of styles." Rockportaal.nl: "From Broken Circle Breakdown to Alabama Shakes: a beautiful mix of influences."

Since its release And Then Came Fall has been touring extensively throughout Belgium and The Netherlands. It is often Annelies Tanghe and Sam Pieter Janssens performing as a two-piece band. But And Then Came Fall performs also as a five-piece band, complemented with keys and backings (Eva Hautekiet), bass (Mathias Moors) and drums (Steven Van Gelder). And Then Came Fall supported many renowned international artists like as Joan As Police Woman, Sarah Blasko, Donavon Frankenreiter and K's Choice.

"Should We" (2020, single) 
The band decided to release a new single on February 14. And Then Came Fall celebrated its upcoming tour with Belgian rock band De Mens with new song "Should We". It was also the precursor of a forthcoming second album. "Once again", music blog Luminous Dash writes, "this music is of an emotional beauty with the taking lead voice of Annelies Tanghe."

"Please Don't Disappear" (2020, single) 
During lockdown (March 2020) - when And Then Came Fall normally would have been on tour - Annelies Tanghe wrote a topical song about loneliness, isolation, and yet resisting the fear of losing your loved ones during the COVID-19 crisis. Annelies Tanghe and Sam Pieter Janssens recorded their parts separately in their own homestudio. Starman Records released the song on April 24, 2020. Musiczine.net about the song: "The result is a moving and fragile song that touches us in these bizarre times. A warm song with deep lyrics." "Please Don't Disappear" made it into many playlists on Spotify worldwide and on Belgian national Radio 1, Studio Brussel).

Other singles (2021 - 2022) 

 Chasing The Sun (Starman Records)
 Love Like Gold (Starman Records)

The Art Of Love (2023, full album) 
Together with producer David Poltrock (De Mens, Hooverphonic, Portland, ...) the band released two EPs in 2022 and spring 2023. The Art Of Love, the connecting power of love, is a theme that fits well after the pandemic in which we had to miss each other far too long.

Band members 
 Annelies Tanghe: vocals, guitars, keys, piano, percussion, songwriting
 Sam Pieter Janssens: guitars, drums, bass, percussion, backing vocals, production

Additional live band members:
 Eva Hautekiet: keys, piano, backing vocals
 Mathias Moors: bass
 Steven Van Gelder: drums

Discography

Albums 
And Then Came Fall:

 Released February 1 2018
 Label: Starman Records
 Formats: CD, LP
The Art Of Love:

 Released March 10 2023
 Label: Starman Records
 Formats: CD, LP

Singles 
 "Disqualified" (Starman Records, 2017)
 "Gambler" (Starman Records, 2018)
 "Mirror" (Starman Records, 2018)
 "Biggest Enemy" (Starman Records, 2018)
 "Carved" (Starman Records, 2019)
 "Should We" (Starman Records, 2020)
 "Please Don't Disappear" (Starman Records, 2020)
 "Chasing The Sun" (Starman Records, 2021)
 "Love Like Gold" (Starman Records, 2022)

References

External links 
 Official website

Indie pop groups
Belgian pop music groups
2017 establishments in Belgium